Francis Thrower Fairey (November 11, 1887 – November 4, 1971) was a Canadian politician, who served as a Liberal member of the House of Commons of Canada from 1953 to 1957. He was a teacher by career.

He was first elected at the Victoria riding in the 1953 general election, but was defeated by Albert McPhillips of the Progressive Conservatives in the 1957 election.

Prior to entering politics, he served as a teacher in Vancouver, British Columbia, Deputy Minister of Education, provincial Director of Industrial and Technical Education and also the Regional Director of the Canadian Vocational Training Program. The vocational training facility at Victoria High School, Fairey Technical Unit ("Fairey Tech"), was named after him.

Fairey was the brother of Edith Munro and the uncle of Douglas Albert Munro.

References

External links
 
 Victoria High School Alumni News, The Man Who Inspired “Fairey Tech” and The Story of Fairey Tech, 1949-2011
 

1887 births
1971 deaths
Politicians from Liverpool
English emigrants to Canada
Members of the House of Commons of Canada from British Columbia
Liberal Party of Canada MPs
Canadian educators